Lycée Jean Jacques Rousseau may refer to:
Lycée Jean-Jacques Rousseau (Haidaraville, Chad), HaidaraVille, Chad
Lycée Jean Jacques Rousseau (Sarresselles)